Frostburg is an unincorporated community in Jefferson County, in the U.S. state of Pennsylvania.

History
A post office was established in the community under the name Frostburgh in 1858. The final "h" was removed in 1892.

Notable architecture
 Frostburg Hopewell United Methodist Church: Celebrating its 175th anniversary in 2019, this church is the oldest church in Jefferson County, Pennsylvania.

References

Unincorporated communities in Jefferson County, Pennsylvania
Unincorporated communities in Pennsylvania